Ray B. Oladapo-Johnson is a public park designer and administrator, and an expert in the restoration of historical landscapes. He is currently the Vice President of Park Operations at The High Line in New York City. Previously, he was Director of Park Operations at the Emerald Necklace Conservancy, which seeks to restore and preserve Boston's 1200 acre Emerald Necklace park system, designed by Frederick Law Olmsted.

Formerly the Curator of Horticulture at all New York City Zoos, he is credited for being instrumental in the creation of award-winning exhibits including the Bronx Zoo's Madagascar exhibit. Prior to working at the Bronx Zoo, Oladapo-Johnson participated in the co-ordination of the replanting of New York City's street trees and public parks and the creation of street triangles. He also played a key role in helping to replant regions in New York devastated by the Asian Longhorn Beetle. Oladapo-Johnson also worked at New Yorkers for Parks, formerly known as the Parks Council, where he was instrumental in the transformation of community gardens into city public parks. 

Of Nigerian and Trinidadian heritage, Oladapo-Johnson was educated at King's College Taunton, a private boarding school in England, received his undergraduate degree from prestigious University of Ibadan, Nigeria before studying urban design at New York City's Pratt Institute.

References 

American horticulturists
Environment of New York City
Year of birth missing (living people)
Living people
Nigerian emigrants to the United States
University of Ibadan alumni
American people of Trinidad and Tobago descent
American people of Yoruba descent
Yoruba people
Nigerian horticulturists
Pratt Institute alumni
People educated at King's College, Taunton
Nigerian designers